Oliver Goldstick (born January 9, 1961) is an American television screenwriter and executive producer, working on Netflix’s new series Bridgerton. Prior to this, Goldstick launched High School Musical: The Series for Disney + and spent seven years writing, directing, and showrunning the series, Pretty Little Liars. During that time, he also wrote and produced The Collection, an original, limited series set in the sumptuous, postwar world of Paris fashion for BBC Studios, Amazon U.K. and PBS-Masterpiece. His other credits include Ugly Betty, Lipstick Jungle, Desperate Housewives, American Dreams, Everwood, Inconceivable, Popular, Coach, and Plainsong for Hallmark Hall of Fame. Trained as a playwright, Goldstick’s theatre credits include Dinah Was, an Obie-winning tribute to R & B legend, Dinah Washington. This off-Broadway production was later broadcast on NPR. His play 'Wild Boy' explores the challenges of autism.

For his television work, Goldstick has received the Golden Globe, Writers Guild Award, three People’s Choice Awards, GLAAD Award, NAACP Image Award, and a Peabody Award.

A native of Detroit, Goldstick is a graduate of the U-Michigan and Columbia University, and currently resides with his family in Los Angeles.

References

External links 

American television producers
American male television writers
Living people
1961 births
American LGBT screenwriters
American soap opera writers
Writers Guild of America Award winners